Cristian Edgardo Amado (born 7 June 1985), known as Piojo, is an Argentine former footballer who played as a striker.

He played professionally in Portugal, notably appearing for Tondela in all four major levels.

Club career
Born in Puerto Iguazú, Misiones Province, Piojo spent his entire professional career in Portugal, starting out at Portimonense S.C. in the Segunda Liga in 2004. He went on to represent Silves FC, Atlético Clube de Portugal, Imortal DC, Sport Benfica e Castelo Branco and C.D. Tondela, achieving promotion to the Primeira Liga with the latter club at the end of the 2014–15 season and contributing 33 games and ten goals to the feat.

Piojo made his top-division debut on 23 August 2015, playing roughly 30 minutes in a 1–0 away loss against Boavista FC. The following June, after having appeared sparingly as his team retained their status, the 31-year-old was released.

Honours
Tondela
Segunda Liga: 2014–15
Terceira Divisão: 2008–09

References

External links

1985 births
Living people
People from Puerto Iguazú
Argentine footballers
Association football forwards
Primeira Liga players
Liga Portugal 2 players
Segunda Divisão players
Portimonense S.C. players
Atlético Clube de Portugal players
Imortal D.C. players
Sport Benfica e Castelo Branco players
C.D. Tondela players
Argentine expatriate footballers
Expatriate footballers in Portugal
Argentine expatriate sportspeople in Portugal
Sportspeople from Misiones Province